The Mexican Workers' Party (in Spanish: Partido Mexicano de los Trabajadores, PMT) was an old Mexican political party of left, that had legal registration in the 1980s, its main political figures were Heberto Castillo and Demetrio Vallejo.

The PMT had its origin in the years of Student Movement of 1968, especially the Tlatelolco massacre, and with the participation of noticeable intellectuals and social fighters as Heberto Castillo, Carlos Fuentes, Octavio Paz and Luis Villoro it gave origin of the National Committee of Auscultation and Coordination. After the exit of some of these personalities, it was constituted as a political party in 1975, but would only manage to obtain its registration in 1984, participating in the Legislative elections of 1985.

In 1987, in an effort to unify the different leftist forces in Mexico, the PMT and the Unified Socialist Party of Mexico fused and created the new Mexican Socialist Party, which two years later would be the main origin of the Party of the Democratic Revolution.

References

See also
Unified Socialist Party of Mexico
List of political parties in Mexico
Party of the Democratic Revolution

Socialist parties in Mexico
Political parties established in 1975
Political parties disestablished in 1987
Defunct political parties in Mexico
1987 disestablishments in Mexico
1975 establishments in Mexico